William H. Hand Jr. (1875–1946) was an American yacht designer.  Hand has been described as one of the most prolific yacht designers of the 20th century with an exceptionally good eye for handsome boats. Hand's career began around 1900 with the design of small sailboats, but he soon shifted to V-bottomed powerboats. These latter were his specialty until after World War I, when he directed his talent to seakindly schooners including the famous examples Bowdoin and S.S.S. Lotus. Later during the 1930s, motorsailers became his passion; examples still sailing include the Guildive (a ketch).  Hand's office was in Fairhaven, Massachusetts (but advertisements in The Rudder and Motorboat magazines indicate he did business in New Bedford, MA, prior to Fairhaven).

The New England Hurricane of 1938 and accompanying tidal surge damaged or destroyed a good deal of Hand's design work and records.  Hand's surviving drawings are at the Hart Nautical Collections, MIT Museum in Cambridge, Massachusetts.

Existing examples
 Nathaniel Bowditch, schooner
 Bowdoin, Arctic schooner
 June Adair schooner
 Lotus
 Guildive
 Zodiac, schooner
 Hindu schooner. Currently in Key West, Florida
 Elsita
 William Hand
 Noreaster, motorsailer
 Maramel, schooner

References
A two-part article on Hand, published in Woodenboat Nos. 28 and 29 (May/June and July/August 1979) covers the designer's career.  Additional material is in Waldo Howland's book Life in Boats: The Years Before the War, published by Mystic Seaport in 1984.  For a rundown on Hand's drawings, refer to Kurt Hasselbalch's Guide to Davis-Hand Collection by MIT in 1998.

Tasmanian One-Design
 See Tasmanian One Design class of Australia.

Notes

External links
 Hart Nautical Collections: Davis-Hand Collection
 Afloat: The designs of William Hand and R.O. Davis
 Tasmanian One-Design Yachts - inspired by a Wm Hand Knockabout
 Guildive, Castine, Me
 Sail Schooner Hindu, Key West, FL

1875 births
1946 deaths
American yacht designers
Brown University alumni
Engineers from Massachusetts